The Seattle Mariners are a Major League Baseball (MLB) franchise based in Seattle, Washington. They play in the American League West division. Since the franchise entered the league as an expansion team in 1977, they have selected 47 players in the first round. Officially known as the "First-Year Player Draft", the Rule 4 Draft is Major League Baseball's primary mechanism for assigning amateur baseball players from high schools, colleges, and other amateur baseball clubs to its teams. The draft order is determined based on the previous season's standings, with the team possessing the worst record receiving the first pick. In addition, teams that lost free agents in the previous off-season may be awarded compensatory or supplementary picks. The First-Year Player Draft is unrelated to the 1976 expansion draft through which the Mariners filled their roster.

Of the 47 players selected in the first round by the Mariners, 18 have been pitchers, the most of any position; of whom 13 were right-handed and five left-handed. They have also drafted nine outfielders, eight shortstops, seven catchers, three first basemen and two third baseman.  Seattle has never drafted a second baseman in the first round. The Mariners have drafted 22 players out of high school, and 24 out of college. All of the college selections came from four-year institutions; the team has never selected a junior college player in the first round. The Mariners have drafted 11 players from high schools or colleges in California, four players from Florida, and a single player from their home state of Washington. One of the Mariners' 2007 picks—Canadian Phillippe Aumont—is the only selection from outside the United States.

One Mariners first-round selection is a member of the Baseball Hall of Fame. Two of the Mariners' first-round selections, Alex Rodriguez and Griffey, are members of the 500 home run club. Rodriguez won a World Series title with the New York Yankees, four Hank Aaron Awards, three American League MVP awards, and was named to 13 All-Star teams. The Mariners have held the first overall pick four times, most recently in 1993. The Mariners have made eight selections in the supplemental round of the draft and 11 compensatory picks over their history. These additional picks are provided when a team loses a particularly valuable free agent in the previous off-season, or, more recently, if a team fails to sign a draft pick from the previous year. The Mariners have failed to sign two of their picks, Scott Burrell in 1989 and John Mayberry, Jr. in 2002. For failing to sign these picks, the team received the 38th pick in the 1990 draft and the 37th pick in the 2003 draft, respectively.

Key

Picks

See also
Seattle Mariners minor league players

Footnotes
 Through the 2012 draft, free agents were evaluated by the Elias Sports Bureau and rated "Type A", "Type B", or not compensation-eligible. If a team offered arbitration to a player but that player refused and subsequently signed with another team, the original team was able to receive additional draft picks. If a "Type A" free agent left in this way, his previous team received a supplemental pick and a compensatory pick from the team with which he signed. If a "Type B" free agent left in this way, his previous team received only a supplemental pick. Since the 2013 draft, free agents are no longer classified by type; instead, compensatory picks are only awarded if the team offered its free agent a contract worth at least the average of the 125 current richest MLB contracts. However, if the free agent's last team acquired the player in a trade during the last year of his contract, it is ineligible to receive compensatory picks for that player.
 The Mariners gained a supplemental first-round pick in 1983 as compensation for losing free agent Floyd Bannister.
 The Mariners gained a supplemental first-round pick in 1985 as compensation for losing free agent Steve Henderson.
 The Mariners gained a supplemental first-round pick in 1989 as compensation for losing free agent Mike Moore.
 The Mariners gained a supplemental first-round pick in 1990 as compensation for not signing first-round draft pick Scott Burrell.
 The Mariners gained a supplemental first-round pick in 1999 as compensation for losing free agent Mike Timlin.
 The Mariners lost their first-round pick in 2000 to the New York Mets as compensation for signing free agent John Olerud.
 The Mariners gained a supplemental first-round pick in 2001 as compensation for losing free agent Alex Rodriguez.
 The Mariners gained a supplemental first-round pick in 2003 as compensation for not signing first-round draft pick John Mayberry, Jr.
 The Mariners lost their first-round pick in 2004 to the Minnesota Twins as compensation for signing free agent Eddie Guardado.
 The Mariners gained a supplemental first-round pick in 2007 as compensation for losing free agent Gil Meche.
 The Mariners received a compensatory first-round pick in 2009 from the Philadelphia Phillies as compensation for free agent Raúl Ibañez.
 The Mariners gained a supplemental first-round pick in 2009 as compensation for losing free agent Raúl Ibañez.
 The Mariners gained a supplemental first-round pick in 2010 as compensation for losing free agent Adrián Beltré.
 The Mariners lost their first-round pick in 2015 for signing free agent Nelson Cruz.

References
General references

In-text citations

External links
Draft results at The Baseball Cube and The Official Website of the Seattle Mariners.

First-round
Seattle Mariners